Tbilisi, in some languages still known by its pre-1936 name Tiflis, is the capital and the largest city of Georgia, lying on the banks of the Kura River with a population around 1.5 million people. Tbilisi was founded in the fifth century AD by Vakhtang I of Iberia, and since then has served as the capital of various Georgian kingdoms and republics. Between 1801 and 1917, then part of the Russian Empire, Tiflis was the seat of the Caucasus Viceroyalty, governing both the northern and the southern parts of the Caucasus.

Because of its location on the crossroads between Europe and Asia, and its proximity to the lucrative Silk Road, throughout history, Tbilisi was a point of contention among various global powers. To this day the city’s location ensures its position as an important transit route for energy and trade projects. Tbilisi's history is reflected in its architecture, which is a mix of medieval, neoclassical, Beaux Arts, Art Nouveau, Stalinist, and Modern structures.

Historically, Tbilisi has been home to people of multiple cultural, ethnic, and religious backgrounds, though it is overwhelmingly Eastern Orthodox Christian. Its notable tourist destinations include cathedrals Sameba and Sioni, Freedom Square, Rustaveli Avenue and Agmashenebeli Avenue, medieval Narikala Fortress, the pseudo-Moorish Opera Theater, and the Georgian National Museum.

Names and etymology

The name  (the place of warmth) was therefore given to the city because of the area's numerous sulfuric hot springs.

On 17 August 1936, by order of the Soviet leadership, the official Russian names of various cities were changed to more closely match the local language. In addition, the Georgian-language form  was modernized on the basis of a proposal by Georgian linguists; the ancient Georgian component  ('warm') was replaced by the newer . This form was the basis for a new official Russian name.

On 20 September 2006, the Georgian parliament held a ceremony celebrating the 70th anniversary of the renaming.

Some of the traditional names of Tbilisi in other languages of the region have different roots.  The Ossetian name  derives from the Georgian word  meaning simply city. Chechen and Ingush names for the city use a form similar to or the same as their names for the country of Georgia as does the historical Kabardian name, while Abkhaz  is from the Mingrelian .

History

Early history
Archaeologists discovered evidence of continuous habitation of the Tbilisi suburb of Dighomi since the early Bronze Age, and stone artifacts dating to the Paleolithic age.

During the late Bronze Age to early Iron Age, it was the largest settlement in the Caucasus. According to legend, the present-day territory of Tbilisi was covered by forests as late as 458. One widely accepted variant of the Tbilisi foundation myth states that King Vakhtang I of Iberia went hunting in the heavily wooded region with a falcon (sometimes the falcon is replaced with either a hawk or other small birds of prey in the legend). The king's falcon allegedly caught or injured a pheasant during the hunt, after which both birds fell into a nearby hot spring and died from burns. King Vakhtang became so impressed with the hot springs that he decided to clear the forest and build a city on the location.

King Dachi of Iberia, the successor of Vakhtang I, moved the capital of Iberia from Mtskheta to Tbilisi and began construction of the fortress wall that lined the city's new boundaries. From the sixth century, Tbilisi grew at a steady pace due to the region's strategic location along with important trade and travel routes between Europe and Asia.

Foreign domination
Tbilisi's favorable trade location, however, did not necessarily bode well for its survival. Located strategically in the heart of the Caucasus between Europe and Asia, Tbilisi became an object of rivalry among the region's various powers such as the Roman Empire, Parthia, Sassanid Persia, Muslim Arabs, the Byzantine Empire, and the Seljuk Turks. The cultural development of the city was somewhat dependent on who ruled the city at various times, although Tbilisi was fairly cosmopolitan.

From 570 to 580, the Persians ruled the city until 627, when Tbilisi was sacked by the Byzantine/Khazar armies and later, in 736–738, Arab armies entered the town under Marwan II. After this point, the Arabs established an emirate centered in Tbilisi. In 764, Tbilisi – still under Arab control – was once again sacked by the Khazars. In 853, the armies of Arab leader Bugha Al-Turki invaded Tbilisi in order to enforce its return to Abbasid allegiance. The Arab domination of Tbilisi continued until about 1050. In 1065, the Seljuk Sultan Alp Arslan campaigned against the Kingdom of Georgia, subjugated Tbilisi, and built a mosque in the city.

Capital of Georgia
In 1121, after heavy fighting with the Seljuks, the troops of King David IV of Georgia besieged Tbilisi, which ended in 1122, and as a result, David moved his residence from Kutaisi to Tbilisi, making it the capital of a unified Georgian State, thus inaugurating the Georgian Golden Age. From the 12–13th centuries, Tbilisi became a regional power with a thriving economy and astonishing cultural output. By the end of the 12th century, the population of Tbilisi had reached 100,000. The city also became an important literary and cultural center, not only for Georgia, but also for the Eastern Orthodox world of the time. During Queen Tamar's reign, Shota Rustaveli worked in Tbilisi while writing his legendary epic poem, "The Knight in the Panther's Skin". This period is often referred to as "Georgia's Golden Age" or the Georgian Renaissance.

Mongol domination and other instability

Tbilisi's "Golden Age" did not last for more than a century. In 1226, Tbilisi was captured by the Khwarezmian Empire Shah Jalal ad-Din, and its defenses severely devastated and prone to Mongol armies. In 1236, after suffering crushing defeats to the Mongols, Georgia came under Mongol domination. The nation itself maintained a form of semi-independence and did not lose its statehood, but Tbilisi was strongly influenced by the Mongols for the next century both politically and culturally. In the 1320s, the Mongols retreated from Georgia and Tbilisi became the capital of an independent Georgian state once again. An outbreak of the plague struck the city in 1366.

From the late 14th until the end of the 18th century, Tbilisi came under the rule of various foreign invaders once again and on several occasions was completely burnt to the ground. In 1386, Tbilisi was invaded and sacked several times by the armies of Tamerlane. In 1440, the city was invaded and destroyed by Jahan Shah (the Shah of the town of Tabriz in Persia). From 1477 to 1478 the city was held by the Ak Koyunlu tribesmen of Uzun Hassan.

Iranian control

As early as the 1510s, Tbilisi (and the kingdoms of Kartli and Kakheti) were made vassal territories of Safavid Iran. In 1522, Tbilisi was garrisoned for the first time by a large Safavid force. Following the death of king (shah) Ismail I (r. 1501–1524), king David X of Kartli expelled the Iranians. During this period, many parts of Tbilisi were reconstructed and rebuilt. The four campaigns of the king Tahmasp I (r. 1524–1576) resulted in the reoccupation of Kartli and Kakheti, and a Safavid force was permanently stationed in Tbilisi from 1551 onwards. With the 1555 Treaty of Amasya, and more firmly from 1614 to 1747, with brief intermissions, Tbilisi was an important city under Iranian rule, and it functioned as a seat of the Iranian vassal kings of Kartli whom the shah conferred with the title of vali. In 1718, the Venetian senate implored the Safavid emperor Soltan Hoseyn to protect the Catholic Armenians and Capuchin missionaries in Tbilisi from the Gregorian Armenians. Under the later rules of Teimuraz II and Heraclius II, Tbilisi became a vibrant political and cultural center free of foreign rule—but, fearful of the constant threat of invasion, Georgia's rulers sought Russian protection in the 1783 Treaty of Georgievsk. Despite this agreement, the city was captured and devastated in 1795 by the Iranian Qajar ruler Agha Mohammad Khan, who sought to re-establish Iran's traditional sovereignty over the region.

Russian control

In 1801, the Russian Empire annexed the Georgian Kingdom of Kartli-Kakheti (of which Tbilisi was the capital), later cementing its rule with the Treaty of Gulistan of 1813, which ended Iranian control of Georgia. Within Tsarist Russia, Tbilisi (known then as Tiflis) was included within the Tiflis Uyezd county in 1801, and became the administrative center of the Tiflis Governorate (Gubernia) following the latter's establishment in 1846. Russian Imperial administrators implemented a new European-style city plan and commissioned new buildings in Western styles. Roads and railroads were built to connect Tbilisi to other important cities in the Russian Empire, such as Batumi and Poti. By the 1850s, Tbilisi once again emerged as a major trade and cultural center. The likes of Ilia Chavchavadze, Akaki Tsereteli, Mirza Fatali Akhundzade, Iakob Gogebashvili, Alexander Griboyedov and many other statesmen, poets and artists all found their home in Tbilisi. The city was visited on numerous occasions by and was the object of affection of Alexander Pushkin, Leo Tolstoy, Mikhail Lermontov, the Romanov family and others. The main new artery built under Russian administration was Golovin Avenue (present-day Rustaveli Avenue), on which the Viceroys of the Caucasus established their residence. For much of the early 19th century, Tbilisi's largest ethnic group was Armenian, at some point forming 74.3% of the population.

Brief independence
After the Russian Revolution of 1917, the city served as a location of the Transcaucasus interim government which established, in the spring of 1918, the short-lived independent Transcaucasian Federation with the capital in Tbilisi. At this time, Tbilisi had roughly the same number of Armenians as Georgians, with Russians being the third largest ethnic group. It was in the former Viceroy of the Caucasus's palace where the independence of three Transcaucasus nations – Georgia, Armenia and Azerbaijan – was declared by their respective national councils on 26 to 28 May 1918. After this, Tbilisi functioned as the capital of the Democratic Republic of Georgia until 25 February 1921. From 1918 to 1919, the city also consecutively served as the headquarters of the country's German garrison and later the British 27th Division; Tbilisi was also the main office of the British Chief Commissioner in Transcaucasia, Oliver Wardrop and the High Commissioner to Armenia, Colonel William N. Haskell.

Under the national government, Tbilisi turned into the first Caucasian University City after the Tbilisi State University was founded in 1918. On 25 February 1921, the Bolshevist Russian 11th Red Army invaded Tbilisi and after bitter fighting at the outskirts of the city, declared Soviet rule.

Soviet rule

In 1921, the Democratic Republic of Georgia was occupied by the Soviet Bolshevik forces from Russia, and until 1936 Tbilisi functioned first as the capital city of the Transcaucasian SFSR (which included Armenia, Azerbaijan, and Georgia), and afterward until 1991 as the capital of the Georgian Soviet Socialist Republic. During Soviet rule, Tbilisi's population grew significantly, the city became more industrialized, and it also came to be an important political, social, and cultural centre of the Soviet Union. In 1980 the city housed the first state-sanctioned rock festival in the USSR. As a major tourist destination for both Soviet citizens and foreign visitors, Tbilisi's "Old Town" (the neighborhoods within the original city walls) was reconstructed in the 1970s and 1980s.

Tbilisi witnessed mass anti-Russian demonstrations during 1956 in the 9 March Massacre, in protest against the anti-Stalin policies of Nikita Khrushchev. Peaceful protests occurred in 1978, and in 1989 the April 9 tragedy was a peaceful protest that turned violent.

Post-independence
Since the break-up of the Soviet Union, Tbilisi has experienced periods of significant instability and turmoil. After a brief civil war, which the city endured for two weeks from December 1991 to January 1992 (when pro-Gamsakhurdia and Opposition forces clashed), Tbilisi became the scene of frequent armed confrontations among various mafia clans and illegal business operators. Even during the Shevardnadze Era (1993–2003), crime and corruption became rampant at most levels of society. Many segments of society became impoverished because of unemployment caused by the crumbling economy. Average citizens of Tbilisi started to become increasingly disillusioned with the existing quality of life in the city (and in the nation in general). Mass protests took place in November 2003 after falsified parliamentary elections forced more than 100,000 people into the streets and concluded with the Rose Revolution. Since 2003, Tbilisi has experienced considerably more stability with decreasing crime rates, an improved economy, and a real estate boom. During the 2008 South Ossetia war, the Tbilisi area was hit by multiple Russian air attacks.

After the war, several large-scale projects were started, including a streetcar system, a railway bypass and a relocation of the central station, and new urban highways. In June 2015, a flood killed at least twenty people and caused animals from the city's zoo to be released into the streets.

Politics and administration

The status of Tbilisi, as the nation's capital, is defined by the Article 10 in the Constitution of Georgia (1995) and the Law on Georgia's Capital – Tbilisi (20 February 1998).

Tbilisi is governed by the Tbilisi City Assembly (Sakrebulo) and the Tbilisi City Hall (Meria). The City Assembly and mayor are elected once every four years by direct elections. The Mayor of Tbilisi is Kakha Kaladze and the Chairman of the Tbilisi city Assembly is Giorgi Alibegashvili.

Districts 
Administratively, the city is divided into raions (districts), which have their own units of central and local government with jurisdiction over a limited scope of affairs. This subdivision was established under Soviet rule in the 1930s, following the general subdivision of the Soviet Union. Since Georgia regained independence, the raion system was modified and reshuffled. According to the latest revision, Tbilisi raions include:
 Mtatsminda District Including Neighborhoods: Mtatsminda, Sololaki, Vera, Kiketi, Kojori, Shindisi, Tsavkisi, Tabakhmela
 Vake District Including Neighborhoods: Vake, Bagebi, Vazha Pshavela Quarters, Tskneti, Nutsubidze Plato
 Saburtalo District Including Neighborhoods: Delisi, Vedzisi, Vashlijvari, Bakhtrioni, Khiliani, Didi Dighomi, Zurgovana
 Krtsanisi District Including Neighborhoods: Kala, Ortachala, Ponichala
 Isani District Including Neighborhoods: Avlabari, Navtlughi, Metromsheni, Vazisubani, Eighth Legioni
 Samgori District Including Neighborhoods: Varketili, Third Array, Orkhevi, Dampalo, Lilo, Lower Samgori
 Chughureti District Including Neighborhoods: Chughureti, Kukia, Svanetisubani
 Didube District Including Neighborhoods: Didube, Dighomi Massive
 Nadzaladevi District Including Neighborhoods: Nadzaladevi, Sanzona, Temka, Lotkini, Old Nadzaladevi
 Gldani District Including Neighborhoods: Gldani Massive, Avchala, Mukhiani, Gldanula

Most of the raions are named after historic quarters of the city. The citizens of Tbilisi widely recognise an informal system of smaller historic neighbourhoods. Such neighbourhoods are several, however, constituting a kind of hierarchy, because most of them have lost their distinctive topographic limits. The natural first level of subdivision of the city is into the Right Bank and the Left Bank of the Mt'k'vari.

The names of the oldest neighbourhoods go back to the early Middle Ages and sometimes pose a great linguistic interest. The newest whole-built developments bear chiefly residential marketing names.

In pre-Revolution Tiflis, the Georgian quarter was confined to the southeastern part of the city; Baedeker describes the layout succinctly:

Geography

Location
Tbilisi is located in the South Caucasus at 41° 43' North and 44° 47' East. The city lies in Eastern Georgia on both banks of the Kura River (locally known as Mtkvari). To the north, Tbilisi is bounded by the Saguramo Range, to the east and south-east by the Iori Plain, to the south and west by various endings (subranges) of the Trialeti Range.

The relief of Tbilisi is complex. The part of the city which lies on the right side of the river, though, is built along the foothills of the Trialeti Range, the slopes of which in many cases descend all the way to the edges of the river. The mountains, therefore, are a significant barrier to urban development on its right bank. This type of a geographic environment creates pockets of very densely developed areas, while other parts of the city are left undeveloped due to the complex topographic relief.

To the north of the city, a large reservoir (commonly known as the Tbilisi Sea) is fed by irrigation canals.

Climate

Tbilisi has a humid subtropical climate (Köppen climate classification: Cfa) with considerable continental and semi-arid influences. The city experiences hot, humid summers and moderately cold winters. Like other regions of Georgia, Tbilisi receives significant rainfall throughout the year with no distinct dry period. The city's climate is influenced both by dry (Central Asian/Siberian) air masses from the east and oceanic (Atlantic/Black Sea) air masses from the west. Because the city is bounded on most sides by mountain ranges, the close proximity to large bodies of water (Black and Caspian Seas) and the fact that the Greater Caucasus Mountains Range (further to the north) blocks the intrusion of cold air masses from Russia, Tbilisi has a relatively mild microclimate compared to other cities that possess a similar climate along the same latitudes.

Daytime high temperatures reach or exceed  on an average of 22 days during a typical year. May is the wettest month (averaging  of precipitation) while January is the driest (averaging  of precipitation). Snow falls on average 15–25 days per year. The surrounding mountains often trap the clouds within and around the city, mainly during the Spring and Autumn months, resulting in prolonged rainy and/or cloudy weather. Northwesterly winds dominate in most parts of Tbilisi throughout the year. Southeasterly winds are common as well.

Demographics

Population

As a multiethnic city, Tbilisi is home to more than 100 ethnic groups. Around 89% of the population consists of ethnic Georgians, with significant populations of other ethnic groups such as Armenians, Russians, and Azerbaijanis. Along with the above-mentioned groups, Tbilisi is home to other ethnic groups including Ossetians, Abkhazians, Ukrainians, Greeks, Jews, Assyrians, Yazidis, and others.

Religion

More than 95% of the residents of Tbilisi practise some form of Christianity (the most predominant of which is the Georgian Orthodox Church). The Russian Orthodox Church, which is in full communion with the Georgian Orthodox Church, and the Armenian Apostolic Church have significant followings, as well. A minority of the population (around 1.5%) practises Islam (mainly Shia Islam), while about 0.1% of Tbilisi's population practises Judaism. Also, a Roman Catholic church and the Yazidi Sultan Ezid Temple are found there.

Sports

Until the beginning of the 19th century, sports such as horse-riding (polo in particular), wrestling, boxing, and marksmanship were the most popular city sports. Influence from the Russian Empire brought more Western sports and activities (billiards, fencing) to Tbilisi.

The Soviet period brought an increased popularization of sports that were common in Europe and to a certain extent, the United States. At the same time, Tbilisi developed the necessary sports infrastructure for professional sports. By 1978, the city had around 250 large and small sports facilities, including, among others, four indoor and six outdoor Olympic-sized pools, 185 basketball courts and halls, 192 volleyball facilities, 82 handball arenas, 19 tennis courts, 31 football fields, and five stadiums. The largest stadium in Tbilisi is the Dinamo Arena (55,000 seats) and the second-largest is the Mikheil Meskhi Stadium (24,680 seats). The Sports Palace, which usually hosts basketball games with high attendance and tennis tournaments, can seat about 11,000 people. Vere Basketball Hall is a smaller indoor sports arena with 2,500 in seating capacity.

Football is the most popular sport in Tbilisi, followed by rugby union and basketball. Also, popular sports include wrestling, tennis, swimming, and water polo. It has several professional football and rugby teams, as well as wrestling clubs. U.S. National Basketball Association players Zaza Pachulia and Nikoloz Tskitishvili are Tbilisi natives. Outside of professional sports, the city has a number of intercollegiate and amateur sports teams and clubs.

Tbilisi's signature football club, Dinamo Tbilisi, has not won a major European championship since the 1980–1981 season, when it won the European UEFA Cup Winners' Cup and became the easternmost team in Europe to achieve the feat. The basketball club Dinamo Tbilisi won the Euroleague in 1962, but also never repeated any such feat.

Tbilisi was to host Group A matches for the EuroBasket 2021 at the new 10,000-seat Tbilisi Arena (next to the Olympic Palace), as one of the tournament co-hosts alongside Czech Republic (Prague), Germany (Berlin, Cologne), and Italy (Milan).

Media
The large majority of Georgia's media companies (including television, newspaper, and radio) are headquartered in Tbilisi. The city is home to the popular Rustavi 2 television channel which gained considerable fame after its coverage of the Rose Revolution. In addition to Rustavi 2, the remaining three out of the four major public television channels of Georgia (including Imedi TV Maestro and the Public Broadcasting Channel) are based in the city. Tbilisi's television market has experienced notable changes since the second half of 2005 when Rustavi 2 successfully bought out the Mze TV company and Rupert Murdoch's News Corporation became a shareholder of Imedi Media Holding at the beginning of 2006.

Tbilisi has a number of newspaper publishing houses. Some of the most noteworthy newspapers include the daily 24 Saati ("24 Hours"), Rezonansi ("Resonance"), Alia, the English-language daily The Messenger, weekly FINANCIAL, Georgia Today, and the English-language weekly The Georgian Times. Out of the city's radio stations Imedi Radio (105.9 FM), Fortuna, and Radio 105 are some of the most influential competitors with large national audiences.

Radio stations in Tbilisi include 5 Lines Radio (93.8 FM), Europe +Tbilisi (99.6 FM), and Georgian Patriarchy Radio (105.4 FM).

Culture

Architecture

The architecture in the city is a mixture of local (Georgian) and Byzantine, Neoclassical, Art Nouveau, Beaux-Arts, Middle Eastern, and Soviet modern styles. Very few buildings survived the destruction of the city in 1795, so most historical buildings in Tbilisi date to the Russian Imperial period (1801–1917). The oldest parts of the city (Kala, Abanotubani, Avlabari) were largely rebuilt on their medieval street plans, and some old houses were even rebuilt on much older foundations. The areas of downtown Tbilisi which were developed according to a European-style plan by Russian authorities (Sololaki, Rustaveli Avenue, Vera, etc.) have a Western appearance, with a mix of styles popular in Europe at the time: Beaux Arts, Orientalist, and various period revival styles.

Tbilisi is most notable for its abundance of Art Nouveau buildings and details (common in Sololaki and Chughureti), which flourished from the mid-1890s to through the end of Russian rule. Art Nouveau was decreed as bourgeois by communist authorities, who introduced experimental modern architecture. The more conservative and historically-inflected Stalinist architecture in Georgia is embodied by the 1938 Marx-Engels-Lenin Institute building ("Imeli"), now housing the Biltmore Hotel Tbilisi.

Tbilisi's postwar architecture is similar to the brand of midcentury modernism found across the Soviet Union. The city expanded dramatically in response to a housing crisis after World War II. Entire neighborhoods (Saburtalo, Dighomi) appeared on the outskirts of the city in a matter of decades, built with advances in mass-production technology. Georgian architects produced some of the Soviet Union's most interesting architectural achievements, including Tbilisi's 1975 Ministry of Roads and the 1984 Wedding Palace. Since the collapse of the Soviet Union, the urban landscape is largely characterized by unregulated construction. New towers occupy formerly public spaces and overcrowded apartment buildings sprout "kamikaze loggia" overnight. Since 2004, the city government has taken initiatives to curb uncontrolled construction projects with mixed success. Soon Tbilisi will have three skyscraper complexes. The Axis Towers, Redix Chavchavadze 64, and the new Ajara Hotel/Business Complex, which is currently under construction, will be the tallest buildings/skyscrapers in the Caucasus.

Art museums and galleries
The Georgian National Museum gathers several important museums, including the Art Museum of Georgia. The Museum of Modern Art was founded in 2012. Two independent contemporary art organisations, Kunsthalle Tbilisi and Open Space of Experimental Art, were founded in 2018.

Performing arts

The city has important theatre and music institutions, such as the Tbilisi State Conservatoire, the Tbilisi Opera and Ballet Theatre, the Shota Rustaveli State Academic Theatre, Marjanishvili State Academic Theatre, Rezo Gabriadze Marionette Theatre and Royal District Theatre.

Film Festival

The Tbilisi International Film Festival (TIFF) is hosted by the Cinema Art Center, Prometheus. It was first held in 2000, within a larger framework of festivals called Gift, until the Prometheus centre was established in 2002, after which it has been held there. It is located at 164 Agmashenebeli Avenue.

World Book Capital 
Tbilisi was designated as the World Book Capital for 2021 by UNESCO.

Tourism

Georgia's growing popularity as an international tourist destination has put Tbilisi on the global travel map. With the country hosting more than 9 million international visitors in 2019, the capital saw major investments in the hospitality industry. It now is the leading tourist destination in the region, offering exquisite cityscapes, Art Deco, Russian, Eastern and Soviet architecture, national museums and galleries, cultural attractions, festivals, historical landmarks and exceptional, traditional Georgian cuisine along with a wide range of international restaurants. The city is well-known, due to its complicated history, as a melting pot of cultures, a diverse metropolis with a palette of attractions.

Main sights

Tbilisi has important landmarks and sightseeing locations. The Parliament and the government (State Chancellery) buildings of Georgia, the Supreme Court of Georgia, the Sameba Cathedral, the Vorontsov's Palace (also known as the Children's Palace today), the National Public Library of the Parliament of Georgia, the National Bank of Georgia, Tbilisi Circus, The Bridge of Peace, and many state museums are in Tbilisi. During the Soviet times, Tbilisi continuously ranked in the top four cities in the Soviet Union for the number of museums.

Out of the city's historic landmarks, the most notable are the Narikala fortress (4th–17th century), Anchiskhati Basilica (6th century, built up in the 16th century), Sioni Cathedral (8th century, later rebuilt), and Church of Metekhi, Open Air Museum of Ethnography, Sulfur Bath, and Tbilisi Old City.

Nightlife
Beyond traditional attractions, Tbilisi has developed burgeoning nightclub culture which started to attract international media attention in the 2010s. The leading clubs such as Bassiani, Mtkvarze, Khidi, and Café Gallery have featured major international DJs as well as local performers. Due to the growing queer nightlife scene the city is also home to several underground LGBTQ+ venues.

Economy

With a GDP at basic prices of 12,147 million Georgian lari (€4.3 billion) in 2014, Tbilisi is the economic center of the country, generating almost 50 percent of Georgia's GDP. The service sector, including government services, is dominating and contributes 88 percent to GDP. Its GDP per capita of 10,336 Georgian lari (€3,600) is exceeding the national average by more than 50 percent. The service sector itself is dominated by the wholesale and retail trade sector, reflecting the role of Tbilisi as transit and logistics hub for the country and the South Caucasus. The manufacturing sector contributes only 12 percent to Tbilisi's GDP, but is much larger, by employment and total value added, than the manufacturing sectors in any other region of Georgia. The unemployment rate in Tbilisi is – with 22.5 percent – significantly higher in Tbilisi than in the regions.

Transport

The public transport system and the relevant infrastructure in Tbilisi is primarily managed by the Transport and Urban Development Agency. After decades of poor transport services and the prioritisation of private vehicles, the city has since the 2010s, invested heavily in developing a green, extensive and diverse public transit network. Today, the city is served by an international airport, metro and national rail services, municipal buses, minibuses, cabs, cable cars, bike lanes and a funicular.

Airport

Handling 3.69 million passengers in 2019, it is the busiest airport in Georgia and the seventeenth busiest airport in the former Soviet Union. The airport has been rapidly growing over the past decade, handling more than 3.56 million passengers in 11 months of 2018. It is a hub for the national carrier Georgian Airways and Georgian-Chinese start-up Myway Airlines. 
Various international carriers serve routes to major European and Asian hubs, such as London, Munich, Berlin, Amsterdam, Dubai, Brussels, Milan, Vienna, Paris, and Doha. The Irish ultra-low-cost carrier Ryanair started operating from the airport in 2019.

Tbilisi International Airport in 2016 started to utilize solar energy and became the first "green airport" in the Caucasus region in 2008.

Natakhtari Airfield, located 33 km north of Tbilisi in the town of Natakhtari, is a domestic airport serving the capital on routes to Batumi, Mestia and Ambrolauri.

Metro

The Tbilisi Metro serves the city with rapid transit subway services. More than 400 thousand journeys are made on the system every single day. It was the Soviet Union's fourth metro system. Construction began in 1952 and was finished in 1966. The system operates two lines, the Akhmeteli-Varketili Line and the Saburtalo Line. It has 23 stations and 186 metro cars. Most stations, characteristic to Soviet-built metro systems, are extravagantly decorated. Trains run from 6:00 am to midnight. Due to the uneven ground, the rail lines run above ground in some areas. Two of the stations are above ground.

In 2020 it was announced by the city government that the metro system is set for a major upgrade with the renovation of all stations, targeting more sustainable and modern design, as well as step-free wheelchair accessibility. Moreover, Tbilisi will purchase 40 new, modern train cars, or 10 trains, becoming the first major rolling stock upgrade in the network's more than 50-year-old history.

The third overground line is planned to connect central Tbilisi with suburbs and Tbilisi International Airport with a possible extension to Rustavi, 30 km east of Tbilisi.

Rail
Tbilisi is the busiest intersection of Georgian Railways services, primarily centred within Tbilisi Central Railway Station. From there, the national rail operator offers inter-city services to Batumi, Zugdidi, Poti, Ozurgeti, Kutaisi and other large cities, as well as several suburban rail services.

Buses
Tbilisi's bus network forms a crucial backbone of the city's transit system. For almost a decade, up to 700 outdated buses of various size were serving the city, majority of them were Ukrainian Bogdan A144 and A092 models. Nowadays the city has an extensive network of municipal buses, including a growing number of night bus services. In August 2020, the mayor of Tbilisi Kakha Kaladze announced major changes in the existing public transit system. Notably, the city will introduce 10 Bus Rapid Transit corridors in the nearest future, served by large 18 meters long buses, running with significantly shorter intervals. These services are named TBT(Tbilisi Bus Transit) lines and are indexed numbers from 300 until 310. Besides the TBT lines, the new system includes 44 city and 185 local lines, totalling up to over 240 bus routes within the city.

The initial reorganization of the bus network started in 2016 when back then-mayor of Tbilisi Davit Narmania started an ambitious project in efforts to revamp the outdated fleet. Under his city government, 143 energy-efficient MAN Lion's City buses were purchased and delivered in 2017. New MAN Lion's City Later in 2018, the tender was announced to order 90 new buses. Tegeta trucks&Buses won the tender and delivered 90 Man Lion's City low floor buses to the city in early 2019. Later on, the city purchased more than 400 new buses from two different manufacturers, including 12-meter long, low floor BMC vehicles and shorter 8.5 meters long Isuzu city buses. It was also announced that the city will be buying 200 18 meter long articulated buses in the nearest future in hopes of further expanding the city's bus network and decreasing intervals.

Cycling
Cycling has been becoming increasingly popular among the residents of Tbilisi over the past few years. For decades, this green mode of transport was seen unfit for the mountainous and uneven terrain of the city. However, as the city's government started introducing new bike lanes across the city, a rising number of people turned towards bikes for regular use. One of the first major central Tbilisi bike lanes opened along Pekini Avenue in 2017, following the long rehabilitation process. The 2.8 meter wide lane failed to attract regular users amid the lack of a greater, city-wide network. Soon the city unveiled more bike lanes, including within recreational areas, such as the National Botanical Garden of Georgia and Lisi Lake.

The expansion of the city's cycling infrastructure network was significantly accelerated during the COVID-19 pandemic as cities across the globe started organising pop-up bike lanes. Tbilisi joined the global trend, unveiling cycling lanes in city's central areas, such as Vake, Vera and the bank of the Kura River. Following these changes, the total length of Tbilisi's bike lanes increased from 2 km in 2019 to over 20 km in 2020. The head of the city's transport department told Euronews Georgia that Tbilisi is working on a 20-year long urban mobility development strategy. According to the plan, the total length of the bike lane network will eventually reach 350 km across the capital.

Tram

Tbilisi had a tram network, since 1883 starting from horse-driven trams and from 25 December 1904 electric tramway. When the Soviet Union disintegrated, electric transport went to a degradation state within the years and finally the only tram line left was closed on 4 December 2006 together with two trolleybus lines which were left. There are plans to construct a modern tram network.

Minibus
For a long time, the most dominant form of transport was the minibus network. An elaborate minibus system grew in Tbilisi over the early 2000s. Amid the lack of public funding and rundown infrastructure, minibuses emerged as a private initiative and a short-term resolution to the city transportation problem. In 2019, the company operating yellow minibuses in Tbilisi was asked to replace the entire fleet by the end of 2020. However, the process was slowed down and only 300 minibuses were replaced. The mayor of Tbilisi announced that the number of minibuses in Tbilisi will gradually decrease, eventually vanishing from Tbilisi's streets.

In addition to the city, several lines also serve the surrounding countryside of Tbilisi. Throughout the city, a fixed price is paid regardless of the distance (80 or 50 tetri in 2018). For longer trips outside the city, higher fares are common. As of April 2018, there are no predefined stops for the minibus lines, except 14 streets, they are hailed from the streets like taxis and each passenger can exit whenever he likes.

Aerial tramways
Historically, the city had seven different aerial tramways, but all of them closed after the collapse of the Soviet Union.

Since 2012, Tbilisi has a modern, high-capacity gondola lift which operates between Rike Park and the Narikala fortress; each gondola can carry up to 8 persons. The system was built by the Italian manufacturer Leitner Ropeways.

Since October 12, 2016, Turtle Lake aerial tramway (originally opened in 1965) reopened after seven years out of service. It underwent major reconstruction but kept the old designs of gondolas and stations. This tramway connects Vake Park with Turtle Lake.

Since October 2016, another Soviet-era aerial tramway between State University (Maglivi) and University Campus (Bagebi) in Saburtalo District (originally opened in 1982) is being reconstructed after 13 years of abandonment and is due for opening in April 2018. The original Italian-produced cabins produced by Lovisolo and provided by Ceretti & Tanfani, with a capacity of 40 passengers each, are being kept as well as the stations.

Due to mismanagement at the hands of Soviet authorities, one of the main aerial trams experienced a major malfunction, causing the 1990 Tbilisi aerial tramway accident and remaining closed ever since. Since October 2017, the aerial tram has been under reconstruction, keeping the old culturally significant lower station but with plans for new gondolas, masts, upper station and other infrastructure. The project is carried out by Doppelmayr Garaventa Group.

Funicular

Tbilisi funicular reopened 2012 after a multi-year closure. It is a ropeway railway first built 1905, connecting Chonkadze street and Mtatsminda Park, and covering almost  in altitude difference. The top of the hill is the highest point of the city, offering many different views of Tbilisi, and is home to the Tbilisi TV Broadcasting Tower as well as some amusement rides, including a roller-coaster and a ferris wheel.

The half-way station of the funicular is just a short way away from Mtatsminda Pantheon, providing easy access to the necropolis.

Education

Tbilisi is home to several major institutions of higher education including the Tbilisi State Medical University and the Petre Shotadze Tbilisi Medical Academy, famous for their internationally recognised medical education system. The biggest Georgian university is Tbilisi State University which was established on 8 February 1918. TSU is the oldest university in the whole Caucasus region. Over 35,000 students are enrolled and the number of faculty and staff (collaborators) is approximately 5,000. Tbilisi is also home to the largest medical university in Caucasus region – Tbilisi State Medical University, which was founded as Tbilisi Medical Institute in 1918 and became the Faculty of Medicine within the Tbilisi State University (TSU) in 1930. Tbilisi State Medical Institute was renamed to Medical University in 1992. Since that university operates as an independent educational institution, TSMU became one of the high-ranking state-supported institutions of higher education in the Caucasus region. There are  almost 5000 undergraduate and 203 postgraduate students at the university of whom 10% come from foreign countries.

Georgia's main and largest technical university, Georgian Technical University, is in Tbilisi. Georgian Technical University was founded in 1922 as a polytechnic faculty of the Tbilisi State University. The first lecture was read by the world-famous Georgian mathematician Professor Andria Razmadze. It achieved University status by 1990. The three most popular private higher educational institution in Georgia —The University of Georgia (Tbilisi), Caucasus University, and the Free University of Tbilisi – are in Tbilisi.

The University of Georgia (Tbilisi) is the largest private University in Georgia, with more than 3500 international and local students. It was established in 2005 and soon became a market leader within Georgian educational sector. In 2010, the UG received financing from OPIC (Overseas Private Investment Corporation) for a development of the University's infrastructure and technical equipment. The University of Georgia has various undergraduate and graduate programs and it's the first company in Georgia which offers international certificate programs of the Oracle Corporation, Microsoft, Zend technologies and Cisco Academy.

Caucasus University was established in 2004 as an expansion of the Caucasus School of Business (CSB) (established in 1998) by a consortium consisting of Tbilisi State University and Georgian Technical University in partnership with Georgia State University (Atlanta, USA). The Free University of Tbilisi was established in 2007 through the merger of two higher education schools: European School of Management (ESM-Tbilisi) and Tbilisi Institute of Asia and Africa (TIAA). Today Free University comprises three schools — Business School (ESM), Institute of Asia and Africa and Law School — delivering academic programs at the undergraduate, graduate and doctorate levels. In addition, Free University conducts a wide array of short-term courses and runs several research centers and summer school programs.

Higher educational institutions in Tbilisi:

 Tbilisi State University
 Ilia State University
 Georgian Technical University
 Tbilisi State Conservatory
 Shota Rustaveli Theatre and Film University
 Sulkhan-Saba Orbeliani University
 Tbilisi State Academy of Arts
 The University of Georgia (Tbilisi)
 Tbilisi State Medical University
 Caucasus University
 Caucasus International University
 Tbilisi Medical Academy
 Free University of Tbilisi
 Grigol Robakidze University – Alma Mater
 Georgian American University
 International Black Sea University
 Georgian Institute of Public Affairs
 Agricultural University of Georgia
 International School of Economics (ISET)
 The University of Geomedi
 New Vision University

Expatriate community 

Tbilisi is home to many foreigners. The number of foreigners living and working in Tbilisi has risen in recent years together with the openings of international schools, businesses, expatriate communities, and online networks. Tbilisi is a very safe city. Most of the expatriates live in Vake, Vera, Saburtalo, and Dighomi. 

 IWA, the International Women Association, is a non-profit organization founded in 1996; its members and participants are international and Georgian women.
 Expats in Tbilisi was an online support network founded by UN and EU staff spouses in Georgia to support expatriates in finding information and all relevant resources in one place.
 Inter-nation International

International relations

Twin towns and sister cities
Tbilisi is twinned with:

Partnerships

See also

 Abo Tbileli, the patron saint of Tbilisi
 Baku-Tbilisi-Ceyhan pipeline
 List of Tbilisians

Notes

References

Bibliography

Further reading
 Postcard from the Silk Road -(Georgia), TRAVELS – ESPECIALLY FOR „ZNAD WILII”, Leonard Drożdżewicz, „Znad Wilii”, Viešoji įstaiga „Znad Wilii” kultūros plėtros draugija,ISSN 1392-9712 indeks 327956 nr 1 (57) z 2014 r., pp. 87–98, (in Polish) http://www.znadwiliiwilno.lt/wp-content/uploads/2020/04/Znad-Wilii-57m.pdf
 Tbilisi’s largely forgotten and neglected Armenian heritage

External links

 Official website of the City of Tbilisi

 
5th-century establishments
Archaeological sites in Georgia (country)
Capitals in Asia
Capitals in Europe
Populated places along the Silk Road
Populated places established in the 5th century
Regions of Georgia (country)
Self-governing cities in Georgia (country)
Tiflis Governorate